The 1985–86 NCAA Division III men's ice hockey season began in November 1985 and concluded on March 22 of the following year. This was the 13th season of Division III college ice hockey.

Though ECAC 2 formally split into two separate conferences in 1985, all games played between ECAC East and ECAC West teams would count for their conference standings. This arrangement remained until 1992.

ECAC 3, in order to prevent confusion with the other two Division III ECAC conferences, was renamed ECAC North/South and divided into two divisions (North and South).

In 1990 the NCAA ruled that Plattsburgh State had violated regulations by allowing some of their players to reside in houses owned by people invested in the ice hockey program and were provided with some benefits including free housing, free meals and cash loans. Because these violations occurred between 1985 and 1988 Plattsburgh State's participation in all NCAA games during that time was vacated.

Regular season

Season tournaments

Standings

Note: Mini-game are not included in final standings

1986 NCAA Tournament

Note: * denotes overtime period(s)Note: † Plattsburgh State's participation in the tournament was later vacated by the NCAA

See also
 1985–86 NCAA Division I men's ice hockey season

References

External links

 
NCAA